Beenleigh Blue is a thin-rinded, unpressed soft blue cheese made from pasteurised  ewe's milk  and vegetarian rennet produced by the Ticklemore Cheese Company in Ashprington, Devon, England. The cheese originated in the 1980s with a limited line by Robin and Sari Congdon, and thereafter became available to consumers throughout the year.

Originally made by Robin Congdon in the 1970s who was seen as one of the first pioneers in the 1970s to revive the tradition of milking sheep in the UK,  it is now made by Ben Harris who is in overall charge of the dairy and the main cheesemaker.

Composition
The cheese has been described as having a creamy texture with notes of fruitiness, mushroom and nutty flavour. Its composition is crumbly and moist, and it has an overall sweet flavour.  After the blue veining within the cheese develops, it is wrapped in foil and then aged for at least three months.

See also
 List of British cheeses
 List of cheeses

References

Further reading
 The World Cheese Book – Juliet Harbutt. p. 173.
 Cheese: A Connoisseur's Guide to the World's Best - Max McCalman. p. 84.

English cheeses
Sheep's-milk cheeses